The Cousin (Italian: La cugina is an Italian drama film by the director Aldo Lado, with a score by Ennio Morricone, that was released in 1974. From a novel by Ercole Patti, it tells the coming of age stories of a group of young people in Sicily in the 1950s.

Summary
Like other young bourgeois men, Enzo learns about sex with servants, whores and married women. None excite him like his alluring cousin Agata, who has tantalised him with erotic games since childhood. Her ambition, however, is to keep her virginity and make an advantageous marriage. She sets her sights on Nini, amiable but dim, who is a nobleman and has a country estate. To force his hand, a venal priest arranges a fake abduction and then marries the pair. Now baroness and mistress of a vast palazzo, she discovers that her precious virginity was wasted on Nini, who is uninterested in marital sex. When a proud Enzo comes round to tell the two that he has graduated, she gives herself to him at last.

Production
In an interview published in 2005 the director said the story of the original novel was altered so that the erotic tension between the two cousins gradually intensified up to the time of their final encounter. When filming it, he and his cinematographer decided to alternate between normal time and slow motion: “What I wanted to convey was that for them at that moment time as we know it had ceased to exist.”

Cast
 Massimo Ranieri as Enzo 
 Dayle Haddon as Agata 
 Christian De Sica as Ninì Scuderi 
 Stefania Casini as Lisa Scuderi 
 Loredana Martinez as Giovannella 
 Stefano Oppedisano as Ugo 
 Francesca Romana Coluzzi as Deputy's Wife 
 José Quaglio as Fragalà 
 Laura Betti as Rosalia 
 Conchita Airoldi as Maid 
 Luigi Casellato as Peppino 
 Cinzia Romanazzi as Carmela 
 Lisa Seagram as Murderess

References

External links

Films set in Sicily
1974 films
Films directed by Aldo Lado
Films scored by Ennio Morricone
1970s erotic drama films
Italian erotic drama films
1970s Italian-language films
1974 drama films
1970s Italian films